The 2012 Iranian Futsal 2nd Division will be divided into two phases.

The league will also be composed of 24 teams divided into two divisions of 12 teams each, whose teams will be divided geographically. Teams will play only other teams in their own division, once at home and once away for a total of 22 matches each.

Teams

Group A

Group B 

1 Jame Jam Yazd Renamed to Eisatis Yazd

Standings

Group A

Group B

See also 
 2011–12 Iranian Futsal Super League
 2011–12 Iran Futsal's 1st Division
 2011–12 Persian Gulf Cup
 2011–12 Azadegan League
 2011–12 Iran Football's 2nd Division
 2011–12 Iran Football's 3rd Division
 2011–12 Hazfi Cup
 Iranian Super Cup

References 

Iran Futsal's 2nd Division seasons
3
3